Rena is an unincorporated community in Clallam County, in the U.S. state of Washington.

History
A post office called Rena was established in 1891, and remained in operation until 1902. The community was named after Reena Hooker.

References

Unincorporated communities in Clallam County, Washington
Unincorporated communities in Washington (state)